Disney's Eureka! A California Parade was a parade in Disney California Adventure at the Disneyland Resort that  showed the various cultures of California. It ran from the Park's opening in 2001 to mid-2002. It was replaced three years later with Block Party Bash.

Parade setlist
The parade played the song Come Away With Me, with each unit playing a variation of the song. The parade consisted of:
 Opening unit (Main Song)
 Hispanic California (Song performed in both English and Spanish)
 Los Angeles (Song performed as a Rap)
 Outdoor California (Instrumental beach rock cover)
 Chinatown (Instrumental Chinese cover)
 Golden State Finale (Combination of the Opening, Hispanic, and Los Angeles Units)

References

 

Walt Disney Parks and Resorts parades